The following is a list of notable events and releases of the year 1944 in Norwegian music.

Events

 August
 21 – Song of Norway by Robert Wright and George Forrest, adapted from the music of Edvard Grieg opened at Broadway.

Deaths

 April
 1 – Sandra Droucker, classical pianist, composer and radio personality (born 1875).

Births

 January
 9 – Roy Hellvin, pianist, composer, and music arranger.

 February
 24 – Oddbjørn Blindheim, jazz pianist and dentist.

 June
 7 – Erling Wicklund, jazz trombonist, composer, music arranger and journalist.
 19 – Arne Holen, musicologist.

 July
 4 – Jan Erik Kongshaug, sound engineering, jazz guitarist, and composer.
 17 – Aage Teigen, jazz trombonist (died 2014)

 October
 1 – Yngvar Numme, singer, actor, revue writer and director.

 Unknown date
 Jiri Hlinka, music professor and piano teacher.

See also
 1944 in Norway
 Music of Norway

References

 
Norwegian music
Norwegian
Music
1940s in Norwegian music